Calvin Valentine Clarke (February 14, 1916 – December 15, 1995) was an American baseball right fielder in the Negro leagues. He played with the Washington Black Senators in 1938 and the Newark Eagles in 1941.

References

External links
 and Seamheads

Newark Eagles players
Washington Black Senators players
1916 births
1995 deaths
Baseball players from Washington, D.C.
Baseball outfielders
20th-century African-American sportspeople